Kampong Bokok is a village in Temburong District, Brunei, about  from the district town Bangar. The population was 182 in 2016. It is one of the villages within Mukim Bokok. The postcode is PE1951.

Facilities 
Bokok Religious School is the village's government school for the country's Islamic religious primary education.

The village mosque is Pengiran Haji Abu Bakar Mosque. It was inaugurated on 26 February 1988 and can accommodate 200 worshippers.

References 

Bokok